Covington County is a county located in the U.S. state of Mississippi. As of the 2020 census, the population was 18,340. Its county seat is Collins. The county is named for U.S. Army officer and Congressman Leonard Covington.

History

Covington County was established on January 5, 1819, less than two years after Mississippi earned statehood into the Union.  The county was one of the first counties established out of the vast non-agricultural lands in the more eastern part of the state.  Covington was originally cut out of Lawrence and Wayne Counties, and encompassed what is now Jefferson Davis, Covington, and Jones Counties.

In 1823, part of Covington County became Bainbridge County, most likely named after William Bainbridge, who became an American naval hero during the War of 1812.  The next year, in 1824, the Mississippi legislature did away with Bainbridge County, giving its lands back to Covington County.

Geography

Adjacent counties
 Smith County (north)
 Jones County (east)
 Forrest County (southeast)
 Lamar County (south)
 Jefferson Davis County (west)
 Simpson County (northwest)

Transportation

Major highways
  U.S. Highway 49
  U.S. Highway 84

Covington County is crossed both north-to-south and east-to-west by four-laned state highways. Highway 49, which runs north–south through all three municipalities and is commonly known as Mississippi's Main Street, connects the state's three largest cities—Jackson, Gulfport, and Hattiesburg—to Covington County as well as cities such as Wiggins, Magee, Clinton, and Yazoo City. Highway 49 brings to Covington County thousands each day.

Highway 84 cuts across Covington County east to west, and runs through the City of Collins.  Highway 84 connects the mid-size cities of Laurel, Brookhaven, and Natchez to Covington County.

Minor highways
A network of two-laned highways runs through Covington County, connecting big cities and small communities alike. Main Street Collins is Highway 184, formerly Highway 84. Main Street Seminary is Highway 590.  Others include:
 Mississippi Highway 35 (Mt. Olive, Mize, Raleigh)
 Mississippi Highway 37 (Collins to Taylorsville)
 Mississippi Highway 184 (Collins)
 Mississippi Highway 588 (Collins to Ellisville)
 Mississippi Highway 598 (Sanford)
 Mississippi Highway 589 (Seminary, Sumrall, Purvis)
 Mississippi Highway 590 (Seminary to Ellisville)
 Mississippi Highway 532 (Mt. Olive to Hopewell)
 Mississippi Highway 535 (Seminary to Collins)

Demographics

2020 Census

As of the 2020 United States census, there were 18,340 people, 6,759 households, and 4,965 families residing in the county.

2010 Census

As of the 2010 United States Census, there were 19,568 people living in the county. 63.0% were White, 34.9% Black or African American, 0.2% Asian, 0.1% Native American, 1.0 of some other race and 0.8% of two or more races. 1.9 were Hispanic or Latino (of any race).

By age category, Covington County residents were dispersed as follows:  29.1% were under the age of twenty; 23.8% were between the ages of twenty and forty; 32% were between the ages of forty-one and sixty-five; and 15.1% were over age sixty-five. The average age was 37.6 years.  By gender, 48.6% were men and 51.4% were women.

There were 8,496 housing units in the county.  Of these, 47.1% were inhabited by husband/wife families; 5% by a man with no wife present; 18.1% by a woman with no husband present; and 29.7% by non-families.  The average household size was 2.60, and the average family size was 3.14.

2000 Census

As of the census of 2000, there were 19,407 people, 7,126 households, and 5,280 families living in the county. The population density was 47 people per square mile (18/km2). There were 8,083 housing units at an average density of 20 per square mile (8/km2). The racial makeup of the county was 63.42% White, 35.61% Black or African American, 0.13% Native American, 0.12% Asian, 0.02% Pacific Islander, 0.15% from other races, and 0.56% from two or more races. 0.80% of the population were Hispanic or Latino of any race.

There were 7,126 households, out of which 36.60% had children under the age of 18 living with them, 51.50% were married couples living together, 17.20% had a female householder with no husband present, and 25.90% were non-families. 23.60% of all households were made up of individuals, and 10.70% had someone living alone who was 65 years of age or older. The average household size was 2.68 and the average family size was 3.16.

As of the census of 2000 the largest ancestry groups are English 56.2%, African 36% and Scots-Irish 7.1%.

In the county, the population was spread out, with 28.80% under the age of 18, 9.60% from 18 to 24, 27.30% from 25 to 44, 21.20% from 45 to 64, and 13.00% who were 65 years of age or older. The median age was 34 years. For every 100 females there were 92.60 males. For every 100 females age 18 and over, there were 90.40 males.

The median income for a household in the county was $26,669, and the median income for a family was $31,264. Males had a median income of $26,611 versus $18,371 for females. The per capita income for the county was $14,506. About 18.70% of families and 23.50% of the population were below the poverty line, including 31.60% of those under age 18 and 20.30% of those age 65 or over.

Public education

The Covington County School District maintains a total of nine schools, plus an alternative school and a Vocational Education center.

Politics

National politics
On the Presidential level, Covington County is solidly Republican and has been for more than two decades. A Democrat has not won Covington County since 1976, when native Southerner Jimmy Carter bested Gerald Ford by fewer than 300 votes. In the Congress, Covington County falls within the boundaries of Mississippi's Third Congressional District, which is represented by Republican Michael Guest.

State politics
On the state level, Covington County is solidly Republican.  Not since 1995 has Covington County voted for the Democratic gubernatorial nominee. In the 2011 election, Covington County voters elected the Republican nominee in seven of the eight statewide contests. In the Mississippi House of Representatives, the majority of Covington County is represented by Joseph L. "Joe" Warren, one of the longest-serving Democrats in the Mississippi House. Representing smaller portions of Covington County are Blaine Eaton and Bob Evans, both Democrats. In the State Senate, the county is represented by Joey Fillingane, a Republican.

Local politics 

On the local level, Covington County is still heavily Democratic. Of the six county-wide elected positions, all are held by Democrats. This is also the case for the five-member Board of Supervisors.

Visitor attractions

Okatoma River
The Okatoma River, also called Okatoma Creek, carves a winding path north to south through Covington County, running through three towns and eventually emptying into the Bouie River just south of the county line.

People from all over the Southeast travel to the county to canoe and kayak a portion of the river, from Seminary to Sanford. Okatoma Outdoor Post and Seminary Canoe Rental both provide canoe and kayak rentals, as well as lodging on the river. The Okatoma has consistently been ranked among the best rafting sites in the South.

Mitchell Farms
Located just east of Collins, Mitchell Farms is one of the top agri-tourism destinations in south Mississippi.  Families and school groups alike travel to Collins each year to tour the farm and enjoy the pumpkin patch, rustic cabins and farm buildings, corn maze, sunflower field, and other family-oriented features.

Mississippi's Peanut Festival — complete with a harvest king and queen competition, 5K run/walk, food vendors, and children's activities — is held annually in October, attracting several thousand.

Grand Paradise Water Park
Collins' Grand Paradise is a seven-acre water park, one of the largest in Mississippi. Attractions include the Lazy River, Cannon Bowl, Pipeline, and more. Food concessions, lockers, a changing area, and a gift shop are available.

Communities

Cities
 Collins (county seat)

Towns
 Mount Olive
 Seminary

Unincorporated communities

 Hopewell
 Hot Coffee
 Lux
 Ora
 Sanford
 Williamsburg

See also
 National Register of Historic Places listings in Covington County, Mississippi

Notable people
 Dana Andrews, actor and former president of the Screen Actors Guild (born on a farmstead outside Collins, but raised in Texas)
 Ernest Duff (1931-2016), businessman, lawyer and Mormon bishop
 Steve McNair, former NFL quarterback
 Martin Sennett Conner, Governor of Mississippi, 1932–36
 Gerald McRaney, actor
 Dale Houston, singer

References

External links
 

 
Mississippi counties
1819 establishments in Mississippi
Populated places established in 1819